The 2011 Peterborough City Council election took place on 5 May 2011 to elect members of Peterborough City Council in England. This was on the same day as other local elections.

Election result

References

2011
2010s in Cambridgeshire
Peterborough